Discurria insessa, common name the seaweed limpet, is a species of sea snail, a true limpet, a marine gastropod mollusk in the family Lottiidae.

Description
The size of the shell varies between 10 mm and 38 mm.

Distribution
This marine species occurs from South Alaska to Baja California, Mexico

Ecology
D. insessa is believed to live only on Egregia menziesii (feather boa kelp). Young limpets seem to orient randomly on the stipe but adults are almost always oriented longitudinally along the stipe. D. insessa feed both on epiphytes and on the Egregia itself. D. insessa spawns mainly in spring and summer. There is high mortality during the winter—the largest individuals are usually not more than 1 year old. Larvae settle preferentially on large, crowded, post-reproductive Egregia and on fronds which already have adults. They grow fastest if they settle on scars made by older limpets. This species runs away quickly if it contacts a seastar such as Pisaster ochraceus.

References

 Nakano T. & Ozawa T. (2007). Worldwide phylogeography of limpets of the order Patellogastropoda: molecular, morphological and paleontological evidence. Journal of Molluscan Studies 73(1): 79–99

External links
 

Lottiidae
Gastropods described in 1842